During the 2003–04 English football season, Aston Villa competed in the Premier League. Former Leeds United manager David O'Leary was appointed Villa manager in the summer of 2003. 

Under O'Leary, Villa made a very sluggish start to the campaign and found themselves in the relegation zone after winning just two of their first 13 league fixtures. They were still in the bottom three in mid-December before O'Leary galvanized them and they gradually climbed the table. Villa had a fantastic second half of the season and, with two matches remaining, had a chance of qualifying for the Champions League. After extending their unbeaten run to eight games by drawing at Southampton, defeat against Manchester United at Villa Park consigned them to sixth place. The Villains finished five points short of a Champions League place and were edged out of a UEFA Cup spot on goal difference by Newcastle United. 

Nevertheless, it was still a great achievement by O'Leary, who appeared to get the best out of the likes of Gareth Barry, Lee Hendrie, Jlloyd Samuel and 16-goal Juan Pablo Ángel. The Colombian was the club's leading scorer, while Darius Vassell bagged 9 goals to cement his place in England's Euro 2004 squad. Thomas Sørensen and Gavin McCann both had excellent seasons after moving from Sunderland, while Nolberto Solano quickly became a fans' favourite after his mid-season move from Newcastle. 

Among the men to represent Villa for the last time during 2003–04 was Dion Dublin, who netted 48 goals in 155 league games. O'Leary's side reached the last four of the Football League Cup by knocking out Wycombe Wanderers, Leicester City, Crystal Palace and Chelsea. The semi-final first leg, at Bolton, ended in a disappointing 5–2 defeat. Villa Park goals by Thomas Hitzlsperger and Samuel were not quite enough to prevent the Trotters from clinching a place in the final. Manchester United came from behind to knock Villa out of the FA Cup in a third round tie at Villa Park. Despite narrowly missing out on qualifying for Europe, the mood around Villa Park was extremely positive in the summer of 2004. With the likes of Liam Ridgewell, Steven Davis, Peter Whittingham and the Moore brothers (Stefan and Luke) forcing open the first team door, David O'Leary had an abundance of young talent at his disposal.

Final league table

Players

First-team squad
Squad at end of season

Left club during season

Reserve squad
The following players did not appear for the first team this season, and spent most of the season playing for the reserves.

Youth squad
The following players did not appear for the first team this season, and spent most of the season playing for the youth team, but may have also appeared for the reserves.

Under-19s

Under-17s

Other players
The following players did not play for any Aston Villa team this season.

Statistics

Appearances and goals
As of end of season

|-
! colspan=14 style=background:#dcdcdc; text-align:center| Goalkeepers

|-
! colspan=14 style=background:#dcdcdc; text-align:center| Defenders

|-
! colspan=14 style=background:#dcdcdc; text-align:center| Midfielders

|-
! colspan=14 style=background:#dcdcdc; text-align:center| Forwards

|-
! colspan=14 style=background:#dcdcdc; text-align:center| Players transferred or loaned out during the season

|-

Transfers

In

Summer

January

Out

Summer

January

Pre-season

Season results

Notes

References

External links
Aston Villa official website
avfchistory.co.uk 2003–04 season

Aston Villa F.C. seasons
Aston